Naum Leybovich Prokupets (born March 20, 1948) is a Moldovan-born Israeli former sprint canoeist who competed for the Soviet Union in the late 1960s.  He is Jewish.

Biography
Naum Prokupets was born in Basarabeasca, a small town in Moldova. At the age of 17, he was spotted by a canoeing trainer who encouraged him to move to Moscow to train with the national USSR canoeing team. In 1991, after working in senior positions in the sports administration for several years and after the break-up of the Soviet Union, Prokupets immigrated to Israel. Initially he worked as a security guard and a pool lifeguard. Now he is a production worker at the Flextronics electronics plant in Migdal HaEmek. He lives with his family in Nazareth Illit.

Canoeing career
At the 1968 Summer Olympics in Mexico City, he won a bronze medal in the C-2 1000 m event.

Prokupets also won a gold medal in the C-2 10000 m event at the 1971 ICF Canoe Sprint World Championships in Belgrade.

See also
 List of select Jewish canoeists
 Russian immigration to Israel in the 1990s

References

External links
 
 
 

1948 births
Canoeists at the 1968 Summer Olympics
Living people
People from Basarabeasca District
Moldovan male canoeists
Olympic canoeists of the Soviet Union
Olympic bronze medalists for the Soviet Union
Soviet male canoeists
Olympic medalists in canoeing
ICF Canoe Sprint World Championships medalists in Canadian
Jewish Moldovan sportspeople
Moldovan people of Israeli descent
Moldovan emigrants to Israel
Medalists at the 1968 Summer Olympics